Chichester High School for Boys, or CHSB, was a boys' secondary school with academy status, located in the city of Chichester, West Sussex, England. It was formed in 1971 during the schools reformation act of the 1970s by the amalgamation of two established schools; The Lancastrian School (established 1895) and the High School for Boys (established 1929). In 2016, Chichester High School for Boys merged with Chichester High School for Girls, to become just Chichester High School. This occurred after speculation that the two schools would merge, starting from 2014. The new school would adopt purple as its main colour, replacing the previous boys' school green and girls' school navy.

History

Early History (1929 - 1971) 
The Chichester High School for Boys was founded in 1929.

During World War II, children were evacuated from large cities to protect them from The Blitz. Pupils from the Henry Thornton School in London attended Chichester High School for Boys from October 1939 to July 1943. The school had a rule that if the air raid siren sounded before 5 pm there would be no homework that day.

Amalgamation with the Lancastrian School (1971 - 2013) 
The Chichester High School for Boys and the Lancastrian School for Boys were amalgamated in 1971. The sister schools of the Chichester High School for Girls and the Lancastrian School for Girls were also amalgamated at the same time.

Academy Status (2013 - 2016) 
The Chichester High School for Boys converted to Academy status on 1 September 2013 and was taken over by The Kemnal Academies Trust (TKAT).

In July 2015, Ofsted conducted a full inspection and gave the school a 'Requires Improvement' rating.

In September 2016, the Chichester High School for Boys and the Chichester High School for Girls were amalgamated into the Chichester High School.

Uniform 
The Boys and Girls High Schools have merged, so the uniform has changed as of 2016. Since the boys' and girls' schools merged in 2016 purple blazers are worn, along with purple ties, with stripes of each house colour.

Extracurricular activities 
The school's sporting facilities included an international-standard irrigated all-weather hockey pitch, sports hall, tennis courts and grounds for sports such as rugby, cricket, hockey, tennis, squash, athletics, basketball, football, and badminton. A sports centre was completed in 2009.

The school operated a Combined Cadet Force. Its Army section was affiliated with the Princess of Wales's Royal Regiment and it had an RAF section, but no Navy section due to an agreement at the time of the formation with the local Sea Cadets.

Sixth form 
The Sixth Form was divided into Year 12 and Year 13. It was jointly managed by both CHSB and CHSG. Sixth Formers enjoyed privileges, including their own common room, reading room and kitchen. Members of the Sixth Form were not required to wear school uniform.

Old Cicestrians
The school alumni society is called the Old Cicestrians. For some time it was called the Chichester High and Lancastrian Old Boys, or CHALOBs, but reverted to the original name in 2007. In former times a magazine "The Martlet" was issued at the end of each school year as well as a full school photograph. Before converting to a comprehensive system there were eight houses: King, Story, Wilfred, Richards, Andrews, Lake, Bell and Sherborne at the grammar school, each based on a geographical area.

Headteachers
Lancastrian School

 Rev. John Deacon (1845)
Rev. Peter Chris (1853)
Rev. Edward Saunders (1859)
William Lewis (1867)
James Thompson (1873)
Richard P Usher (1888)
Thomas Hayes (1892)
Dr. Samuel Gardner (1905)
Beilert Valance (1919)
John Patrick (1928)
Edwin Bishop (1937)
Neil Young (1942)  (acting)
Alexander Few (1943)
Paul Stanley (1957)
Dr. Peter Bishop (1953)

Chichester High School for Boys

H F Collins MA (London)(1928)
Doctor E W Bishop (1934)
Alfred A Scales  (Acting) (1953-1954)
Kenneth D Anderson MA (Oxon.) (1954)
Dennis Watkins (1972)
Sebastian Green (1977)
Simon Neil (1979)
Ron L Austin (1987)
Mrs Diane Dockrell   (1998)
John Robinson (2005–2009)
Gavin Salvesen-Sawh (2010–2014)
Gary Potter (2014–2015) (Acting)

Chichester High School

Mrs Yasmin Maskatiya (2015–2018)
Mrs Joanne McKeown (2018-

Houses, Communities and Colours 
Formerly each house was named after a Bishop of Chichester, They were: Blake (Yellow), Cawley (Green), Howard (Grey), Lancaster (White), Montgomery (Red), Norfolk (Purple), Richmond (Orange), Sherborne (Dark Blue), and Whitby (Sky Blue). A tenth house, known as "Osbourne", briefly existed during the 1960s.

Between 1956 and 1964 the houses were as follows: Andrews (black), Bell (scarlet), King (purple), Lake (lilac), Richards (green),  Sherborne (yellow), Storey (blue), Wilfred's (crimson). Also named after bishops of Chichester.

Since the start of the term in 2011, the houses were renamed 'communities' after people who had an affiliation to the local area (West Sussex). There were five communities – Canute – Blue, Henry 1st – Red, Story – Yellow, Friar – Green, Bishop – Purple. The Bishop house was eventually dropped, leaving just the other four.

Ever since the two schools merged in 2016, new houses were created. These are Malala King - Blue, Redgrave - Red, Hawking - Yellow, and Rowling - Green. These names were determined by every student in each house voting.

Notable alumni

Arts
 Neil Bartlett – writer, director, actor
 Howard Brenton – playwright
 Michael Elphick (1946–2002) –  actor (Lancastrian School for Boys)
 Adrian Noble – Chief executive from 1990 to 2003 of the Royal Shakespeare Company
 Steven Seagal – Hollywood actor, was briefly enrolled into the school whilst staying with relatives
 David Wood  – actor, playwright

Armed forces
 Air Chief Marshal Sir Brendan Jackson
 Air Chief Marshal Sir Keith Rodney Park- RAF
 Major Timothy Peake – Army Air Corps Apache test pilot and astronaut for the European Space Agency
 Admiral Sir Bertram Home Ramsay 
 General Sir Neil Methuen Ritchie 
 Brigadier Mike Stone (defence) – chief information officer of the Ministry of Defence

Education
 Martin Hall – Vice-Chancellor of the University of Salford since 2009
 Patrick Allen (music educator) – author and teacher
S. Barry Cooper –  Mathematician
Alan Howard Ward –  Physicist

Sport
 Douglas Bunn – founded Hickstead in 1960
 John Snow – English Test cricketer
 Jimmy Hill – English footballer and ex-Chairman of the Professional Footballers' Association. Attended the school when evacuated from London during World War II.
 Sean Heather – Sussex cricketer
 Adam Webster – English footballer 
 Kieran Low – Scottish rugby player – plays 1st team for London Irish RFC and Scotland
 Danny Gray – English rugby union player – played England Sevens from 2006 to 2007

Politics
Sir Jon Shortridge – Permanent Secretary of the Welsh Office
Sir Dudley Gordon Smith – Conservative MP for Warwick and Leamington from 1968 to 1997
Ian Whitting – Ambassador to Iceland and Montenegro

References

External links 
Chichester High School for Boys
Chichester High Schools Sixth Form
South Downs Planetarium

Boys' schools in West Sussex
Education in Chichester
Defunct schools in West Sussex
Educational institutions established in 1971
1971 establishments in England